Minden Township is a township in Benton County, Minnesota, United States. The population was 1,664 as of the 2010 census. Minden Township was organized in 1858.

Geography

The northeast half of the city of St. Cloud and the east quarter of the city of Sauk Rapids are within the township geographically but are separate entities.

Major highways
  Minnesota State Highway 23
  Minnesota State Highway 95

Lakes
 Donovan Lake

Adjacent townships
 Mayhew Lake Township (north)
 Gilmanton Township (northeast)
 St. George Township (east)
 Palmer Township, Sherburne County (southeast)
 Haven Township, Sherburne County (south)
 Sauk Rapids Township (west)
 Watab Township (northwest)

Churches
 Saint Patrick's Catholic Church

Cemeteries
The township contains Saint Patrick's Cemetery.

Demographics
As of the census of 2000, there were 1,790 people, 627 households, and 524 families residing in the township. There were 636 housing units at an average density of 17.5/sq mi (6.8/km). The racial makeup of the township was 98.83% White, 0.11% African American, 0.22% Native American, 0.06% Asian, 0.11% from other races, and 0.67% from two or more races. Hispanic or Latino of any race were 0.39% of the population.

There were 627 households, out of which 38.3% had children under the age of 18 living with them, 75.8% were married couples living together, 3.8% had a female householder with no husband present, and 16.4% were non-families. 13.7% of all households were made up of individuals, and 3.7% had someone living alone who was 65 years of age or older.  The average household size was 2.85 and the average family size was 3.15.

In the township the population was spread out, with 27.7% under the age of 18, 7.8% from 18 to 24, 28.3% from 25 to 44, 27.4% from 45 to 64, and 8.8% who were 65 years of age or older.  The median age was 38 years. For every 100 females, there were 109.6 males.  For every 100 females age 18 and over, there were 107.7 males.

The median income for a household in the township was $58,854, and the median income for a family was $61,164. Males had a median income of $41,458 versus $25,347 for females. The per capita income for the township was $21,130.  About 2.7% of families and 3.8% of the population were below the poverty line, including 2.4% of those under age 18 and 6.0% of those age 65 or over.

References
 United States National Atlas
 United States Census Bureau 2007 TIGER/Line Shapefiles
 United States Board on Geographic Names (GNIS)

Townships in Benton County, Minnesota
St. Cloud, Minnesota metropolitan area
Townships in Minnesota